The Game is an American comedy drama television revival series based on The CW/BET 2006 series of the same name. The series premiered on Paramount+ on November 11, 2021.

In February 2022, the series was renewed for a second season which premiered on December 15, 2022.

Premise
The series relocates from San Diego to Las Vegas and sees new players offer a modern-day examination of Black culture through the prism of American pro football. The team tackles issues like racism, sexism, classism and more as they fight for fame, fortune, respect and love – all while trying to maintain their souls as they each play The Game.

Cast

Main 
 Wendy Raquel Robinson as Tasha Mack
 Hosea Chanchez as Malik Wright
 Vaughn Hebron as Jamison Fields
 Adriyan Rae as Brittany Pitts
 Analisa Velez as Raquel Navarro
 Toby Sandeman as Garrett Evans

Recurring 
 Tim Daly as Colonel Ulysses S. Thatcher (seasons 1–2)
 Rockmond Dunbar as Pookie
 Asiyih N’Dobe as Kai Mack
 Cecil Blutcher as Caleb Antwan Jones (season 1)
 Derrick A. King as Xavier Mitchell (season 2)
 Bryan Earl as Smoke (season 2)
 Keisha Tillis as Lula Fields (season 2)

Guest stars 
 Pooch Hall as Derwin Davis (season 1)
 Coby Bell as Jason Pitts (seasons 1–2)
 Barry Floyd as Tee-Tee (season 2)

Episodes

Series overview

Season 1 (2021–22)

Season 2 (2022–23)

Production

Development
In December 2019, it was announced that a revival of The Game was in the works at The CW. The new incarnation, to be written by original series creator Mara Brock Akil and Devon Greggory, would have had a new East Coast setting while allowing original cast members to return. Greggory would serve as showrunner and also executive produce the follow-up series with Akil's fellow original executive producers, Salim Akil and Kelsey Grammer, as well as Tom Russo. However, The CW announced in January 2020 that they would not be moving forward with the series.

In September 2020, it was announced that CBS All Access would be developing a sequel series to The Game ahead of its relaunch as Paramount+ in 2021. The series was officially green-lit in May 2021, with Hosea Chanchez and Wendy Raquel Robinson to reprise their respective roles and the setting was relocated to Las Vegas.

On February 1, 2022, Paramount+ renewed the series for a second season with a 10-episode ordered. Production of the second season began on August 8, 2022. The second season premiered on December 15, 2022.

Casting 
In July 2021, it was reported that the new cast members would be Vaughn W. Hebron as Jamison Fields, an undrafted free agent, Adriyan Rae as Brittany Pitts, Jason and Kelly Pitts' daughter, (previous portrayed by Katlynn Simone), Analisa Velez as Raquel Navarro, Brittany's best friend, and Toby Sandeman who had been later cast as Garrett Evans, an American football player who was drafted from a St. Louis team to the Las Vegas Fury. Tia Mowry-Hardrict, who was cast in Netflix's Family Reunion, made a TikTok video expressing that she will most likely not return to her 2 roles of Sister, Sister and The Game. While being honored at the Ebony 'Power 100''', she was interviewed by Entertainment Tonight saying: “You know what’s so funny? Never say never. I mean, as it stands for right now, we aren’t in any talks or communication about me coming back to the show...I know it seems kind of weird, because I’m like, the only one, but you know, Melanie, I loved playing that character, and if everything works out, and if everything works out the way that it should, then who knows? I might be on the show.” 

 Release 
The first two episodes were released on November 11, 2021, with subsequent episodes releasing weekly until January 6, 2022 on Paramount+. The second season premiered on December 15, 2022, with two new episodes available immediately and followed by a new episode on a weekly basis. The first episode aired on BET on February 16, 2022.

 Reception 

Joe Keller, a 'stream it or skip it' critic of the review section Decider of the New York Post states "The return of The Game carries on what made the original series so popular: Well-written characters dealing with real issues". He continues, "If you’re expecting gut-busting laughs, then you didn’t watch the later seasons of the original series (seasons 4-9), which veered more towards drama than anything else. There’s enough that’s funny to generate some chuckles here and there, but the show then and now is character-driven, and Greggory and his writers have done a good job creating new compelling characters."

Stacey Yvonne, Black Girl Nerds wrote: "The Game has made all the right moves and delivers a set a of entertaining premiere episodes for old fans and new viewers...the setup is less sitcom-like and more comedic drama. Gone are the multicam shots with room for punchlines and laughs, instead we’re treated to hard hitting and heartfelt situations infused with the type of biting humor The Game is known for...Even though it is a sequel, it’s also an evolution." She continues, "This reboot is faithful, well thought out, and well produced, it's definitely worth tuning in."

The television news outlet TVLine listed Hosea Chanchez as an 'Honorable mention' in their Performer of the Week review in January 2022 citing: "Chanchez has been a force'' throughout the season, uncovering a more vulnerable side...The actor really drove it home in the season finale, which saw Malik experience an emotional breakdown after finally being honest with himself about what he was going through". They concluded, "We have to applaud Chanchez for breathing fresh new life into a character he’s played for more than a decade-plus an outstanding turn that made us love Malik even more than we already did." A poll was also taken from readers on their season finale recap article early January on how they would grade the finale. The poll was generally favored 65.53% with the grade "A" (excellent) with more than 270 votes out of 412 voting margin.

References

External links
 
 

English-language television shows
2020s American black sitcoms
2020s American comedy-drama television series
2021 American television series debuts
American football television series
American television series revived after cancellation
Paramount+ original programming
Television series by CBS Studios
American sequel television series
Television shows set in the Las Vegas Valley
Television shows shot in the Las Vegas Valley
Racism in television
Works about sexism
Works about classism